The 2nd Airport Expressway, officially numbered S51, is a toll expressway that connects eastern Beijing with Terminal 3 of Beijing Capital International Airport. It opened on February 29, 2008, just prior to the 2008 Beijing Olympics. It runs for 11.5 km from Yaojiayuan Road in Chaoyang District to Terminal 3. It was built to serve the new Terminal 3, and to reduce pressure of Airport Expressway, which has been heavily congested. 

Expressways in Beijing
Expressways in China